Broken Rainbow may refer to:
Broken Rainbow (film), a 1985 documentary film about the forced relocation of members of the Navajo tribe
Broken Rainbow (organisation), a UK organization for victims of same-sex domestic violence